Clare Stephen Jacobs (February 18, 1886 – February 21, 1971) was an American athlete who competed mainly in the pole vault. He was born in Madison, Dakota Territory.

Jacobs was Jewish.  He competed for the United States in the 1908 Summer Olympics held in London, Great Britain in the pole vault where he won the bronze medal jointly with Canadian Edward Archibald and Swedish athlete Bruno Söderström. In 1909, he set two world records in indoor pole vault, one which was unsurpassed for three years.

See also
List of select Jewish track and field athletes

References

External links

1886 births
1971 deaths
American male pole vaulters
Olympic bronze medalists for the United States in track and field
Athletes (track and field) at the 1908 Summer Olympics
Jewish American sportspeople
People from Madison, South Dakota
Medalists at the 1908 Summer Olympics
Sportspeople from South Dakota